Johanna Neuman is an American journalist, and historian.

Life
She worked for USA Today and the Los Angeles Times. She was a Nieman Fellow. 
She graduated from American University. She was scholar in residence at American University.

Works
 
 Lights, camera, war : is media technology driving international politics? New York : St. Martin's Press, 1996. 
 Gilded suffragists : the New York socialites who fought for women's right to vote, New York Washington Mews Books, 2019. 
 And yet they persisted : how American women won the right to vote, Hoboken, NJ : Wiley Blackwell, 2020.

References

External links
 
 

Year of birth missing (living people)
Living people
American women journalists
21st-century American women